Thayamangalam is a small town in the Sivaganga district in the Indian state of Tamil Nadu. The town is 68 km from Madurai and comes under the Ilaiyankudi block. This town has a temple popularly known as Arulmigu Muthumariamman Thirukovil. The town takes its name from the goddess 'Thai' means mother.

Thayamangalam hosts a festival season in March and April. The town is located a short distance from railway stations situated in Paramakudi (20 km), Sivaganga (25 km), and Manamadurai (22 km).
Thayamangalam is located 6.7 km distance from its Taluk Main Town Ilayankudi . Thayamangalam is 22.8 km far from its District Main City Sivaganga . It is 416 km far from its State Main City Chennai.

History

Three hundred years ago, farmers of Ramnad region have traded their crops in the Capital city of Pandya kingdom called Maduraiyampathi.

Panguni festival

Saint Thirugnanasambandhar was invited to Madurai by Queen Pandimadevi Mangayarkarasi for the prosperity of Saivam religion. Saint Appar said that as the day of Sambandar's visit falls on star of Bharani and it is auspicious for travelling. Bharani is also the best time for Conducting homam and setting up brick kiln etc. as this day is suitable for Agni (fire). He started his travel after worshiping God and Goddess by singing Kolaru Padhipaggam. He fought for the freedom of Saivam against the Jainism. Based on the belief in the concept that "each day is a good day", he did Navasakthi Homam and Vinayaka Pooja on the 15th day of Panguni and celebrated 10 days festival from the 16th day of Panguni at Thayamangalam. Pongal festival is being celebrated on the 7th day ( 22nd day of Panguni), Milk pot festival and Flower Pallakku on the Panguni 23rd day. The festival will be completed on 25th day of Panguni after celebrating Devasthana Theertha vari function.a

Archana is performed at the same time for Moolavar and Urchavar in  different locations. This is a speciality in this shrine.

References 

Muthumari Amman Temple

External links
 

Cities and towns in Sivaganga district